The Smoluchowski factor, also known as von Smoluchowski's f-factor is related to inter-particle interactions. It is named after Marian Smoluchowski.

References

See also
 Flocculation
 Smoluchowski coagulation equation
 Einstein–Smoluchowski relation

Physical chemistry